Harold Briggs may refer to:

Harold Douglas Briggs (1877–1944), senior Royal Navy and Royal Air Force officer
Harold Rawdon Briggs (1894–1952), Director of Operations for the British Army in Malaya 1950–1951
Harold Briggs (politician) (1870–1945), British Conservative Member of Parliament

See also
Harry Briggs (1923–2005), English footballer